Petrophile conifera is a species of flowering plant in the family Proteaceae and is endemic to southwestern Western Australia. It is a bushy, much-branched shrub with pinnate, sharply-pointed leaves, and oval heads of hairy, cream-coloured to yellowish white flowers.

Description

Taxonomy
Petrophile conifera was first formally described in 1855 by Carl Meissner in Hooker's Journal of Botany and Kew Garden Miscellany from material collected by James Drummond. The specific epithet (conifera) means "cone-bearing".

In 2011, Michael Clyde Hislop and Kelly Anne Shepherd described two subspecies in the journal Nuytsia and the names are accepted by the Australian Plant Census:

Distribution and habitat
This petrophile grows in heath and on sandplains and is common north of Geraldton in the Avon Wheatbelt and Geraldton Sandplains biogeographic regions of southwestern Western Australia. Subspecies conifera is found from Eurardy Reserve and Kalbarri National Park to the Chapman River near Geraldton and subsp. divaricata only occurs near Coorow.

Conservation status
Petrophile conifera subsp. conifera is classified as "not threatened" but subsp. divaricata is classified as "Priority Two" by the Western Australian Government Department of Parks and Wildlife, meaning that it is poorly known and from only one or a few locations.

References

conifera
Endemic flora of Western Australia
Eudicots of Western Australia
Plants described in 1855
Taxa named by Carl Meissner